South Central Arkansas Electric Cooperative is a non-profit rural electric utility cooperative headquartered in Arkadelphia, Arkansas.  It was organized July 31, 1940. It serves portions of eight counties in the state of Arkansas, in a territory generally west and southwest of Arkadelphia.

Overview 
As of September 2005, the Cooperative had more than 1,770 miles of distribution lines, 9 substations and services 7,300 member accounts. Members are served in Clark, Dallas, Hempstead, Howard, Hot Spring, Montgomery, Nevada and Pike counties. The office is at 1140 Main Street, Arkadelphia.

Community

Each spring, South Central Arkansas Electric Cooperative selects two high school juniors to attend a tour to Washington, D.C., sponsored annually by Electric Cooperatives of Arkansas. Winners are selected through an essay contest. Applicants must be high school juniors and members of the Cooperative.

External links
South Central Arkansas Electric Cooperative

Companies based in Arkansas
Electric cooperatives in Arkansas